XECSCA-AM is a community radio station on 1670 AM in Tarandacuao, Guanajuato, Mexico. The station is owned by the civil association Tarandacuao Pueblo de Abundante Agua, A.C., and known as La Más Perrona.

History
Predecessors to XECSCA operated as a pirate station on 105.5 MHz. A community station application was filed on May 8, 2017, with an AM frequency being approved on December 12, 2018.

References

2019 establishments in Mexico
Community radio stations in Mexico
Radio stations established in 2019
Radio stations in Guanajuato
Spanish-language radio stations